Chukat-e Bala (also Romanized as Chūkāt-e Bālā; also known as Chaukāt, Chokat, Chūgāt, Chukāt, and Chūkāt Dard) is a village in Polan Rural District, Polan District, Chabahar County, Sistan and Baluchestan Province, Iran. At the 2006 census, its population was 273, in 54 families.

References 

Populated places in Chabahar County